Gymnoclytia immaculata is a North American species of tachinid flies in the genus Gymnoclytia of the family Tachinidae.

Hosts
Larvae have been recorded from Pseudaletia unipuncta (Lepidoptera) and Euschistus variolarius (Hemiptera)

Distribution
British Columbia to Quebec, United States & Mexico.

References

External links
 Taxonomic & Host Catalogue of the Tachinidae of America North of Mexico

Phasiinae
Diptera of North America
Insects described in 1844
Taxa named by Pierre-Justin-Marie Macquart